The Stetson Hatters women's volleyball team represents Stetson University in the ASUN Conference. They are currently led by head coach Yang Deng and play their home games at Edmunds Center. The team has won 1 ASUN Conference women's volleyball tournament in 1985, and has won 1 ASUN Conference regular season conference title in 1990.

See also
List of NCAA Division I women's volleyball programs

References

External links